Fireboat No. 1 is a historic fireboat on display in a permanent land installation on the waterfront in the Old Town area of Tacoma, Washington.  Built in 1929, she was for more than fifty years the sole firefighting vessel for the Port of Tacoma.  She was designated a National Historic Landmark in 1980.

Description and history
She has a steel deck and pilothouse. Her deck was originally lined with pipes capable of creating a spray around the ship. As built, she had three-screw drive powered by 425-horsepower gasoline engine, and was capable of making a speed of 15 knots. Two additional engines provided power to its water pumps, and another two could be used either for movement or pumping, differentiated by a clutch setting.

Fireboat No. 1 was built in 1929 for the Port of Tacoma by the Coastline Shipbuilding Company of Tacoma, Washington for US$148,000. She is the only fireboat in U.S. history to protect a major port by herself for more than half a century.  After 54 years of service in waterfront fire protection, harbor security patrols, search and rescue missions, and water pollution control, Fireboat No. 1 was put up  on a permanent dry berth at a public beach near Tacoma's Old Town neighborhood. She is one of only five fireboats designated as a National Historic Landmark. Visitors are able to walk around her exterior, but her interior is closed to the public.

See also

Historic preservation
List of National Historic Landmarks in Washington (state)

References

1929 ships
Fireboats of Puget Sound
History of Tacoma, Washington
Museum ships in Washington (state)
National Historic Landmarks in Washington (state)
Ships on the National Register of Historic Places in Washington (state)
National Register of Historic Places in Tacoma, Washington